Aretha Louise Franklin (March 25, 1942 – August 16, 2018) was an American singer, songwriter and pianist. Referred to as the "Queen of Soul", she has twice been placed ninth in Rolling Stones "100 Greatest Artists of All Time". With global sales of over 75 million records, Franklin is one of the world's best-selling music artists.

As a child, Franklin was noticed for her gospel singing at New Bethel Baptist Church in Detroit, Michigan, where her father C. L. Franklin was a minister. At the age of 18, she was signed as a recording artist for Columbia Records. While her career did not immediately flourish, Franklin found acclaim and commercial success once she signed with Atlantic Records in 1966. Hit songs such as "I Never Loved a Man (The Way I Love You)", "Respect", "(You Make Me Feel Like) A Natural Woman", "Chain of Fools", "Think", and "I Say a Little Prayer", propelled Franklin past her musical peers.

Franklin continued to record acclaimed albums such as I Never Loved a Man the Way I Love You (1967), Lady Soul (1968), Spirit in the Dark (1970), Young, Gifted and Black (1972), Amazing Grace (1972), and Sparkle (1976), before experiencing problems with the record company. Franklin left Atlantic in 1979 and signed with Arista Records. The singer appeared in the 1980 film The Blues Brothers before releasing the successful albums Jump to It (1982), Who's Zoomin' Who? (1985) and Aretha (1986) on the Arista label. In 1998, Franklin returned to the Top 40 with the Lauryn Hill-produced song "A Rose Is Still a Rose"; later, she released an album with the same name.

Franklin recorded 112 charted singles on the US Billboard charts, including 73 Hot 100 entries, 17 top-ten pop singles, 100 R&B entries and 20 number-one R&B singles. Besides the foregoing, the singer's well-known hits also include "Ain't No Way", "Call Me", "Don't Play That Song (You Lied)", "Spanish Harlem", "Rock Steady", "Day Dreaming", "Until You Come Back to Me (That's What I'm Gonna Do)", "Something He Can Feel", "Jump to It", "Freeway of Love", "Who's Zoomin' Who" and "I Knew You Were Waiting (For Me)" (a duet with George Michael). Franklin won 18 Grammy Awards (out of 44 nominations), including the first eight awards given for Best Female R&B Vocal Performance (1968–1975), a Grammy Awards Living Legend honor and Lifetime Achievement Award.

Franklin received numerous honors throughout her career. She was awarded the National Medal of Arts and the Presidential Medal of Freedom. In 1987, she became the first female artist to be inducted into the Rock and Roll Hall of Fame. She also was inducted into the UK Music Hall of Fame in 2005 and into the Gospel Music Hall of Fame in 2012. In 2010, Rolling Stone ranked Franklin number one on its list of the "100 Greatest Singers of All Time". In 2019, the Pulitzer Prize jury awarded the songwriter a posthumous special citation "for her indelible contribution to American music and culture for more than five decades". In 2020, Franklin was inducted into the National Women's Hall of Fame. In 2022, Rolling Stone ranked Franklin number one on its list of the "200 Greatest Singers of All Time".

Early life

Aretha Louise Franklin was born on March 25, 1942, to Barbara (née Siggers) and Clarence LaVaughn "C. L." Franklin. She was delivered at her family's home located at 406 Lucy Avenue, Memphis, Tennessee. Her father was a Baptist minister and circuit preacher originally from Shelby, Mississippi, while her mother was an accomplished piano player and vocalist. Both Mr. and Mrs. Franklin had children from prior relationships in addition to the four children they had together. When Aretha was two, the family relocated to Buffalo, New York. By the time Aretha turned five, C. L. Franklin had permanently relocated the family to Detroit, where he took over the pastorship of the New Bethel Baptist Church.

The Franklins had a troubled marriage due to Mr. Franklin's infidelities, and they separated in 1948. At that time, Barbara Franklin returned to Buffalo with Aretha's half-brother, Vaughn. After the separation, Aretha recalled seeing her mother in Buffalo during the summer, and Barbara Franklin frequently visited her children in Detroit. Aretha's mother died of a heart attack on March 7, 1952, before Aretha's 10th birthday. Several women, including Aretha's grandmother, Rachel, and Mahalia Jackson, took turns helping with the children at the Franklin home. During this time, Aretha learned how to play piano by ear. She also attended public school in Detroit, going through her freshman year at Northern High School, but dropping out during her sophomore year.

Aretha's father's emotionally driven sermons resulted in his being known as the man with the "million-dollar voice". He earned thousands of dollars for sermons in various churches across the country. His fame led to his home being visited by various celebrities. Among the visitors were gospel musicians Clara Ward, James Cleveland, and early Caravans members Albertina Walker and Inez Andrews. Martin Luther King Jr., Jackie Wilson and Sam Cooke all became friends of C. L. Franklin, as well. Ward was romantically involved with Aretha's father from around 1949 to Ward's death in 1973, though Aretha "preferred to view them strictly as friends". Ward also served as a role model to the young Aretha.

Musical career

1952–1960: Beginnings
Just after her mother's death, Franklin began singing solos at New Bethel, debuting with the hymn "Jesus, Be a Fence Around Me". When Franklin was 12, her father began managing her; he would take her on the road with him, during his "gospel caravan" tours for her to perform in various churches. He also helped her sign her first recording deal with J.V.B. Records. Recording equipment was installed inside New Bethel Baptist Church and nine tracks were recorded. Franklin was featured on vocals and piano. In 1956, J.V.B. released Franklin's first single, "Never Grow Old", backed with "You Grow Closer". "Precious Lord (Part One)" backed with "Precious Lord (Part Two)" followed in 1959. These four tracks, with the addition of "There Is a Fountain Filled with Blood", were released on side one of the 1956 album, Spirituals. This was reissued by Battle Records in 1962, under the same title. In 1965, Checker Records released Songs of Faith, featuring the five tracks from the 1956 Spirituals album, with the addition of four previously unreleased recordings. Aretha was only 14 when Songs of Faith was recorded.

During this time, Franklin would occasionally travel with the Soul Stirrers. As a young gospel singer, Franklin spent summers on the gospel circuit in Chicago and stayed with Mavis Staples' family.
According to music producer Quincy Jones, while Franklin was still young, Dinah Washington let him know that "Aretha was the 'next one.

Franklin and her father traveled to California, where she met singer Sam Cooke. At the age of 16, Franklin went on tour with Dr. Martin Luther King Jr., and she would ultimately sing at his funeral in 1968. Other influences in her youth included Marvin Gaye (who was a boyfriend of her sister), as well as Ray Charles and Sam Cooke, "two of Franklin's greatest influences". Also important was James Cleveland, known as the King of Gospel music, "who helped to focus her early career as a gospel singer"; Cleveland had been recruited by her father as a pianist for the Southern California Community Choir.

1960–1966: Columbia years
After turning 18, Franklin confided to her father that she aspired to follow Sam Cooke in recording pop music, and moved to New York. Serving as her manager, C. L. Franklin agreed to the move and helped to produce a two-song demo that soon was brought to the attention of Columbia Records, who agreed to sign her in 1960, as a "five-percent artist". During this period, Franklin would be coached by choreographer Cholly Atkins to prepare for her pop performances. Before signing with Columbia, Sam Cooke tried to persuade Franklin's father to sign her with his label, RCA, but his request was denied since she had decided to go with Columbia. Record label owner Berry Gordy had also asked Franklin and her elder sister Erma to sign with his Tamla label. However, C.L. Franklin felt the label was not yet established enough, and he turned Gordy down. Franklin's first Columbia single, "Today I Sing the Blues", was issued in September 1960 and later reached the top 10 of the Hot Rhythm & Blues Sellers chart.

In January 1961, Columbia issued Franklin's first album, Aretha: With The Ray Bryant Combo. The album featured her first single to chart the Billboard Hot 100, "Won't Be Long", which also peaked at number 7 on the R&B chart. Mostly produced by Clyde Otis, Franklin's Columbia recordings saw her performing in diverse genres, such as standards, vocal jazz, blues, doo-wop and rhythm and blues. Before the year was out, Franklin scored her first with her hit-single rendition of the standard "Rock-a-Bye Your Baby with a Dixie Melody". By the end of 1961, Franklin was named as a "new-star female vocalist" in DownBeat magazine. In 1962, Columbia issued two more albums, The Electrifying Aretha Franklin and The Tender, the Moving, the Swinging Aretha Franklin, the latter of which reached number 69 on the Billboard chart.

In the 1960s, during a performance at the Regal Theater in Chicago, WVON radio personality Pervis Spann announced that Franklin should be crowned "the Queen of Soul". Spann ceremonially placed a crown on her head. By 1964, Franklin began recording more pop music, reaching the top 10 on the R&B chart with the ballad "Runnin' Out of Fools", in early 1965. She had two R&B charted singles in 1965 and 1966, with the songs "One Step Ahead" and "Cry Like a Baby", while also reaching the Easy Listening charts with the ballads "You Made Me Love You" and "(No, No) I'm Losing You". By the mid-1960s, Franklin was making $100,000 per year from countless performances in nightclubs and theaters. Also during that period, she appeared on rock-and-roll shows, such as Hollywood a Go-Go and Shindig! However, she struggled with commercial success while at Columbia. Label executive John H. Hammond later said he felt Columbia did not understand Franklin's early gospel background and failed to bring that aspect out further during her period there.

1966–1979: Atlantic years

In November 1966, Franklin's Columbia recording contract expired; at that time, she owed the company money because record sales had not met expectations.

Producer Jerry Wexler convinced her to move to Atlantic Records. Wexler decided that he wanted to take advantage of her gospel background; his philosophy in general was to encourage a "tenacious form of rhythm & blues that became increasingly identified as soul". The Atlantic days would lead to a series of hits for Aretha Franklin from 1967 to early 1972; her rapport with Wexler helped in the creation of the majority of her peak recordings with Atlantic. The next seven years' achievements were less impressive. However, according to Rolling Stone, "they weren't as terrible as some claimed, they were pro forma and never reached for new heights".

In January 1967, Franklin traveled to Muscle Shoals, Alabama, to record at FAME Studios and recorded the song "I Never Loved a Man (The Way I Love You)", backed by the Muscle Shoals Rhythm Section. Franklin only spent one day recording at FAME, as an altercation broke out between her manager and husband Ted White, studio owner Rick Hall, and a horn player, and sessions were abandoned. The song was released the following month and reached number one on the R&B chart, while also peaking at number nine on the Billboard Hot 100, giving Franklin her first top-ten pop single. The song's B-side, "Do Right Woman, Do Right Man", reached the R&B top 40, peaking at number 37. "Respect" was Otis Redding's song but Aretha modified it with a "supercharged interlude featuring the emphatic spelling-out of the song's title". Her frenetic version was released in April and reached number one on both the R&B and pop charts. "Respect" became her signature song and was later hailed as a civil rights and feminist anthem. Upon hearing her version, Otis Redding said admiringly: "That little girl done took my song away from me." Franklin's debut Atlantic album, I Never Loved a Man the Way I Love You, also became commercially successful, later going gold. According to National Geographic, this recording "would catapult Franklin to fame". Franklin scored two additional top-ten singles in 1967, "Baby I Love You" and "(You Make Me Feel Like) A Natural Woman".

Working with Wexler and Atlantic, Franklin had become "the most successful singer in the nation" by 1968. In 1968, Franklin issued the top-selling albums Lady Soul and Aretha Now, which included some of her most popular hit singles, including "Chain of Fools", "Ain't No Way", "Think", and "I Say a Little Prayer". That February, Franklin earned the first two of her Grammys, including the debut category for Best Female R&B Vocal Performance. On February 16, Franklin was honored with a day named for her and was greeted by longtime friend Martin Luther King Jr., who gave her the SCLC Drum Beat Award for Musicians two months before his death. Franklin toured outside the US for the first time in May, including an appearance at the Concertgebouw, Amsterdam, where she played to a near-hysterical audience who covered the stage with flower petals. She appeared on the cover of Time magazine in June.

In March 1969, Franklin was unanimously voted winner of Académie du Jazz's R&B award, Prix Otis Redding, for her albums Lady Soul, Aretha Now, and Aretha in Paris. That year, Franklin was the subject of a criminal impersonation scheme. Another woman performed at several Florida venues under the name Aretha Franklin. Suspicion was drawn when the fake Franklin charged only a fraction of the expected rate to perform. Franklin's lawyers contacted Florida authorities and uncovered a coercive scheme in which the singer, Vickie Jones, had been threatened with violence and constrained into impersonating her idol, whom she resembled closely both in voice and looks. After being cleared of wrongdoing, Jones subsequently enjoyed a brief career of her own, during which she was herself the subject of an impersonation.

Franklin's success expanded during the early 1970s, during which she recorded the multi-week R&B number one "Don't Play That Song (You Lied)", as well as the top-ten singles "Spanish Harlem", "Rock Steady", and "Day Dreaming". Some of these releases were from the acclaimed albums Spirit in the Dark and Young, Gifted and Black. In 1971, Franklin became the first R&B performer to headline Fillmore West, later that year releasing the live album Aretha Live at Fillmore West.

In January 1972, she returned to Gospel music in a two-night, live-church recording, with the album Amazing Grace, in which she reinterpreted standards such as Mahalia Jackson's "How I Got Over". Originally released in June 1972, Amazing Grace sold more than two million copies, and is one of best-selling gospel albums of all time. The live performances were filmed for a concert film directed by Sydney Pollack, but due to synching problems and Franklin's own attempts to prevent the film's distribution after Hollywood refused to promote a dark-skinned black woman as a movie star at the time, the film's release was only realized by producer Alan Elliott in November 2018.

Franklin's career began to experience problems while recording the album Hey Now Hey, which featured production from Quincy Jones. Despite the success of the single "Angel", the album bombed upon its release in 1973. Franklin continued having R&B success with songs such as "Until You Come Back to Me" and "I'm in Love", but by 1975 her albums and songs were no longer top sellers. After Jerry Wexler left Atlantic for Warner Bros. Records in 1976, Franklin worked on the soundtrack to the film Sparkle with Curtis Mayfield. The album yielded Franklin's final top-40 hit of the decade, "Something He Can Feel", which also peaked at number one on the R&B chart. Franklin's follow-up albums for Atlantic, including Sweet Passion (1977), Almighty Fire (1978) and La Diva (1979), bombed on the charts, and in 1979 Franklin left the company. On November 7, 1979, she guested The Mike Douglas Show with her yellow costume from her La Diva album, and sang "Ladies Only", "What If I Should Ever Need You" and "Yesterday" by the Beatles.

1980–2007: Arista years

In 1980, after leaving Atlantic Records, Franklin signed with Clive Davis's Arista Records. "Davis was beguiling and had the golden touch", according to Rolling Stone. "If anybody could rejuvenate Franklin's puzzlingly stuck career, it was Davis."

Also in 1980, Franklin gave a command performance at London's Royal Albert Hall in front of Queen Elizabeth. Franklin also had an acclaimed guest role as a soul food restaurant proprietor and wife of Matt "Guitar" Murphy in the 1980 comedy musical The Blues Brothers. Franklin's first Arista album, Aretha (1980), featured the number-three R&B hit "United Together" and her Grammy-nominated cover of Redding's "I Can't Turn You Loose". The follow-up, 1981's Love All the Hurt Away, included her famed duet of the title track with George Benson, while the album also included her Grammy-winning cover of Sam & Dave's "Hold On, I'm Comin'". Franklin achieved a gold record—for the first time in seven years—with the 1982 album Jump to It. The album's title track was her first top-40 single on the pop charts in six years. The following year, she released "Get It Right", produced by Luther Vandross.

In 1985, inspired by a desire to have a "younger sound" in her music, Who's Zoomin' Who? became her first Arista album to be certified platinum. The album sold well over a million copies thanks to the hits "Freeway of Love", the title track, and "Another Night". The next year's Aretha album nearly matched this success with the hit singles "Jumpin' Jack Flash", "Jimmy Lee" and "I Knew You Were Waiting for Me", her international number-one duet with George Michael. During that period, Franklin provided vocals to the theme songs of the TV shows A Different World and Together. In 1987, she issued her third gospel album, One Lord, One Faith, One Baptism, which was recorded at her late father's New Bethel church, followed by Through the Storm in 1989.

In 1987, Franklin performed "America the Beautiful" at WWE's Wrestlemania III; one source states that "to this day her WrestleMania III performance might be the most memorable" of the event openers by many artists.

After 1988, "Franklin never again had huge hits", according to Rolling Stone. The 1991 album What You See is What You Sweat flopped on the charts. She returned to the charts in 1993 with the dance song "A Deeper Love" and returned to the top 40 with the song "Willing to Forgive" in 1994. That recording reached number 26 on the Hot 100 and number five on the R&B chart.

In 1989, Franklin filmed a music video for a remake of "Think". In 1990, she sang "I Want to Be Happy", "(You Make Me Feel Like) A Natural Woman", and "Someone Else's Eyes" at the MDA Labor Day Telethon.

In 1995, she was selected to play Aunt Em in the Apollo Theater revival of The Wiz. Franklin's final top 40 single was 1998's "A Rose Is Still a Rose". The album of the same name was released after the single. It sold over 500,000 copies, earning gold certification.

That same year, Franklin received global praise after her 1998 Grammy Awards performance. She had initially been asked to perform in honor of the 1980 film The Blues Brothers, in which she appeared with Dan Aykroyd and John Belushi. That evening, after the show had already begun, another performer, opera tenor Luciano Pavarotti became too ill to perform the aria "Nessun dorma" as planned. The show's producers, desperate to fill the time slot, approached Franklin with their dilemma. She was a friend of Pavarotti and had sung the aria two nights prior at the annual MusiCares event. She asked to hear Pavarotti's rehearsal recording, and after listening, agreed that she could sing it in the tenor range that the orchestra was prepared to play in. Over one billion people worldwide saw the performance, and she received an immediate standing ovation. She would go on to record the selection and perform it live several more times in the years to come. The last time she sang the aria live was for Pope Francis at the World Meeting of Families in Philadelphia in September 2015. A small boy was so touched by her performance that he came onto the stage and embraced her while Franklin was still singing.

Her final Arista album, So Damn Happy, was released in 2003 and featured the Grammy-winning song "Wonderful". In 2004, Franklin announced that she was leaving Arista after more than 20 years with the label. To complete her Arista obligations, Franklin issued the duets compilation album Jewels in the Crown: All-Star Duets with the Queen in 2007. In February 2006 she performed "The Star-Spangled Banner" with Aaron Neville and Dr. John for Super Bowl XL, held in her hometown of Detroit.

2007–2018: Final years
In 2008, Franklin issued the holiday album This Christmas, Aretha on DMI Records. On February 8, 2008, Franklin was honored as the MusiCares Person of the Year, and performed "Never Gonna Break My Faith", which had won her the Grammy for best Gospel performance the year before. Twelve years later, an unheard performance of "Never Gonna Break My Faith" was released in June 2020 to commemorate Juneteenth with a new video visualizing the American human rights movement. This caused the song to enter the Billboard gospel charts at number one, giving Franklin the distinction of having had a number one record in every decade since the 1960s. On November 18, 2008, she performed "Respect" and "Chain of Fools" at Dancing with the Stars.

On January 20, 2009, Franklin made international headlines for performing "My Country, 'Tis of Thee" at President Barack Obama's inaugural ceremony with her church hat becoming a popular topic online. In 2010, Franklin accepted an honorary degree from Yale University. In 2011, under her own label, Aretha's Records, she issued the album Aretha: A Woman Falling Out of Love.

In 2014, Franklin was signed under RCA Records, controller of the Arista catalog and a sister label to Columbia via Sony Music Entertainment, and worked with Clive Davis. There were plans for her to record an album produced by Danger Mouse, who was replaced with Babyface and Don Was when Danger Mouse left the project. On September 29, 2014, Franklin performed to a standing ovation, with Cissy Houston as backup, a compilation of Adele's "Rolling in the Deep" and "Ain't No Mountain High Enough" on the Late Show with David Letterman. Franklin's cover of "Rolling in the Deep" was featured among nine other songs in her first RCA release, Aretha Franklin Sings the Great Diva Classics, released in October 2014. In doing so, she became the first woman to have 100 songs on Billboard Hot R&B/Hip-Hop Songs chart with the success of her cover of Adele's "Rolling in the Deep", which debuted at number 47 on the chart.

In December 2015, Franklin gave an acclaimed performance of "(You Make Me Feel Like) A Natural Woman" at the 2015 Kennedy Center Honors during the section for honoree Carole King, who co-wrote the song. During the bridge of the song, Franklin dropped her fur coat to the stage, for which the audience rewarded her with a mid-performance standing ovation. Dropping the coat was symbolic according to "Rolling Stone": it "echoed back to those times when gospel queens would toss their furs on top of the coffins of other gospel queens — a gesture that honored the dead but castigated death itself".

She returned to Detroit's Ford Field on Thanksgiving Day 2016 to once again perform the national anthem before the game between the Minnesota Vikings and Detroit Lions. Seated behind the piano, wearing a black fur coat and Lions stocking cap, Franklin gave a rendition of "The Star-Spangled Banner" that lasted more than four minutes and featured a host of improvisations. Franklin released the album A Brand New Me in November 2017 with the Royal Philharmonic Orchestra, which uses archived recordings from Franklin. It peaked at number five on the Billboard Top Classical Albums chart before her death and rose to number two after her death.

While Franklin canceled some concerts in 2017 due to health reasons, and during an outdoor Detroit show, she asked the audience to "keep me in your prayers", she was still garnering highly favorable reviews for her skill and showmanship. At the Ravinia Festival on September 3, 2017, she gave her last full concert. Franklin's final public performance was at the Cathedral of St. John the Divine in New York City during Elton John's 25th anniversary gala for the Elton John AIDS Foundation on November 7, 2017.

Music style and image

According to Richie Unterberger, Franklin was "one of the giants of soul music, and indeed of American pop as a whole. More than any other performer, she epitomized soul at its most gospel-charged". She had often been described as a great singer and musician due to "vocal flexibility, interpretive intelligence, skillful piano-playing, her ear, her experience". Franklin's voice was described as being a "powerful mezzo-soprano voice". She was praised for her arrangements and interpretations of other artists' hit songs. According to David Remnick, what "distinguishes her is not merely the breadth of her catalog or the cataract force of her vocal instrument; it's her musical intelligence, her way of singing behind the beat, of spraying a wash of notes over a single word or syllable, of constructing, moment by moment, the emotional power of a three-minute song. 'Respect' is as precise an artifact as a Ming vase." Describing Franklin's voice on her first album, Songs of Faith, released in 1956 when she was just 14, Jerry Wexler explained that it "was not that of a child but rather of an ecstatic hierophant". Critic Randy Lewis assessed her skills as a pianist as "magic" and "inspirational". Musicians and professionals alike such as Elton John, Keith Richards, Carole King, and Clive Davis were fans of her piano performances.

In 2015, President Barack Obama wrote the following regarding Franklin:

Activism
From her time growing up in the home of a prominent African-American preacher to the end of her life, Franklin was immersed and involved in the struggle for civil rights and women's rights. She provided money for civil rights groups, at times covering payroll, and performed at benefits and protests. When Angela Davis was jailed in 1970, Franklin told Jet: "Angela Davis must go free ... Black people will be free. I've been locked up (for disturbing the peace in Detroit) and I know you got to disturb the peace when you can't get no peace. Jail is hell to be in. I'm going to see her free if there is any justice in our courts, not because I believe in communism, but because she's a Black woman and she wants freedom for Black people." Her songs "Respect" and "(You Make Me Feel Like) A Natural Woman" became anthems of these movements for social change. Franklin and several other American icons declined to take part in performing at President Donald Trump's 2017 inauguration as a mass act of musical protest.

Franklin was also a strong supporter of Native American rights. She quietly and without fanfare supported Indigenous peoples' struggles worldwide, and numerous movements that supported Native American and First Nation cultural rights.

Personal life
Born in Memphis, Tennessee, and raised in Detroit, Michigan, Franklin moved to New York City in the 1960s where she lived until relocating to Los Angeles in the mid-1970s. She eventually settled in the Los Angeles neighborhood of Encino, where she lived until 1982. She then returned to the Detroit suburb of Bloomfield Hills to be close to her ailing father and siblings. Franklin maintained a residence there until her death. Following an incident in 1984, she cited a fear of flying that prevented her from traveling overseas; she performed only in North America afterwards.

Franklin was the mother of four sons. She first became pregnant at the age of 12 and gave birth to her first child, named Clarence after her father, on January 28, 1955. In one of her handwritten wills, discovered in 2019, Franklin revealed that the father was Edward Jordan. On August 31, 1957, at the age of 15, Franklin had a second child fathered by Jordan, named Edward Derone Franklin after his father. Franklin did not like to discuss her early pregnancies with interviewers. Both children took her family name. While Franklin was pursuing her singing career and "hanging out with [friends]", her grandmother Rachel and sister Erma took turns raising her children. Franklin would visit them often. Her third child, Ted White Jr., was born to Franklin and her husband Theodore "Ted" White in February 1964 and is known professionally as Teddy Richards. He provided guitar backing for his mother's band during live concerts. Her youngest son, Kecalf Cunningham, was born in April 1970 and is the child of her road manager Ken Cunningham.

Franklin was married twice. Her first husband was Ted White, whom she married in 1961 at the age of 18. She had actually seen White the first time at a party held at her house in 1954. After a contentious marriage that was marred by domestic abuse, Franklin separated from White in 1968 and divorced him in 1969. She married actor Glynn Turman, on April 11, 1978, at her father's church. By marrying Turman, Franklin became stepmother of Turman's three children. Franklin and Turman separated in 1982 after she returned to Michigan from California and they divorced in 1984.

Franklin's sisters, Erma and Carolyn, were professional musicians and spent years performing background vocals on Franklin's recordings. Following Franklin's divorce from Ted White, her brother Cecil became her manager and maintained that position until his death from lung cancer on December 26, 1989. Her sister Carolyn died in April 1988 from breast cancer and her eldest sister Erma died from throat cancer in September 2002. Franklin's half-brother Vaughn died in late 2002. Her half-sister, Carol Ellan Kelley (née Jennings; 1940–2019), is C. L. Franklin's daughter by Mildred Jennings, a 12-year-old member of New Salem Baptist Church in Memphis where C. L. was pastor. Franklin’s father and idol, described as “unorthodox on every level,” knowingly preyed on his pre-teen congregants.

Franklin was performing at the Aladdin Hotel in Las Vegas, Nevada, on June 10, 1979, when her father, C. L., was shot twice at point-blank range in his Detroit home. After six months at Henry Ford Hospital while still in a coma, C. L. was moved back to his home with 24-hour nursing care. Aretha moved back to Detroit in late 1982 to assist with the care of her father, who died at Detroit's New Light Nursing Home on July 27, 1984.

Franklin had a long friendship with Willie Wilkerson, a Vietnam War veteran and Detroit firefighter, who also helped in her work and cared for her when ill. In 2012 she announced plans to marry Wilkerson but the engagement was quickly called off.

Franklin's music business friends included Dionne Warwick, Mavis Staples, and Cissy Houston, who began singing with Franklin as members of the Sweet Inspirations. Houston sang background on Franklin's hit "Ain't No Way". Franklin first met Cissy's young daughter, Whitney Houston, in the early 1970s. She was made Whitney's honorary aunt (not a godmother as has been occasionally reported) and Whitney often referred to her as "Auntie Ree". Franklin had to cancel plans to perform at Whitney Houston's memorial service on February 18, 2012, due to a leg spasm.

Franklin was a Christian and was a registered Democrat.

Health
Franklin had weight issues for many years. In 1974, she lost  on a very-low-calorie diet and maintained her new weight until the end of the decade. She again lost weight in the early 1990s, before gaining some back. A former chain smoker who struggled with alcoholism, she quit smoking in 1992. She admitted in 1994 that her smoking was "messing with my voice", but after quitting smoking she said later, in 2003, that her weight "ballooned".

In 2010, Franklin canceled a number of concerts to have surgery for an undisclosed tumor. Discussing the surgery in 2011, she quoted her doctor as saying that it would "add 15 to 20 years" to her life. She denied that the ailment had anything to do with pancreatic cancer, as had been reported. Franklin added, "I don't have to talk about my health with anybody other than my doctors ... The problem has been resolved". Following the surgery, Franklin lost 85 lbs.; however, she denied that she had undergone weight-loss surgery. On May 19, 2011, Franklin had her comeback show at the Chicago Theatre.

In May 2013, Franklin canceled two performances because of an undisclosed medical treatment. Further concert cancellations followed in the summer and fall. During a phone interview with the Associated Press in late August 2013, Franklin stated that she had had a "miraculous" recovery from her undisclosed illness but had to cancel shows and appearances until her health was at 100%, estimating she was about "85% healed". Franklin later returned to live performing, including a 2013 Christmas concert at Detroit's MotorCity Casino Hotel. She launched a multi-city tour in mid-2014, starting with a performance on June 14 in New York at Radio City Music Hall.

In February 2017, Franklin announced in an interview with local Detroit television anchor Evrod Cassimy, that 2017 would be her final year touring. However, she scheduled some 2018 concert dates before canceling them based on her physician's advice.

Death and funeral
On August 13, 2018, Franklin was reported to be gravely ill at her home in Riverfront Towers, Detroit. She was under hospice care and surrounded by friends and family. Stevie Wonder, Jesse Jackson and former husband Glynn Turman visited her on her deathbed. Franklin died at her home on August 16, 2018, aged 76. She was initially thought to have died without a will. The cause of death was a malignant pancreatic neuroendocrine tumor (pNET), which is distinct from the most common form of pancreatic cancer. Numerous celebrities in the entertainment industry and politicians paid tribute to Franklin, including former U.S. President Barack Obama who said she "helped define the American experience". Civil rights activist and minister Al Sharpton called her a "civil rights and humanitarian icon".

A memorial service was held at New Bethel Baptist Church on August 19. Thousands then paid their respects during the public lying-in-repose at the Charles H. Wright Museum of African American History. The August 31 Homegoing Service held at Greater Grace Temple in Detroit, included multiple tributes by celebrities, politicians, friends and family members and was streamed by some news agencies such as Fox News, CNN, The Word Network, BET and MSNBC. Among those who paid tribute to Aretha at the service were Ariana Grande, Bill Clinton, Rev. Al Sharpton, Louis Farrakhan, Faith Hill, Fantasia, the Clark Sisters, Ronald Isley, Angie Stone, Chaka Khan, Jennifer Holliday, Loretta Devine, Jennifer Hudson, Queen Latifah, Shirley Caesar, Shirma Rouse, Stevie Wonder, Eric Holder, Gladys Knight, Cedric the Entertainer, Tyler Perry, Smokey Robinson, Yolanda Adams, and Rev. Dr. William Barber II. At Franklin's request she was eulogized by Rev. Jasper Williams Jr. of Salem Baptist Church in Atlanta, as he had eulogized her father as well as speaking at other family memorials. Williams's eulogy was criticized for being "a political address that described children being in a home without a father as 'abortion after birth' and said black lives do not matter unless blacks stop killing each other". Franklin's nephew Vaughan complained of Williams: "He spoke for 50 minutes and at no time did he properly eulogize her." Following a telecast procession up Seven Mile Road, Franklin was interred at Woodlawn Cemetery in Detroit.

Legacy and honors

Franklin received a star on the Hollywood Walk of Fame in 1979, had her voice declared a Michigan "natural resource" in 1985, and became the first woman inducted into the Rock and Roll Hall of Fame in 1987. The National Academy of Recording Arts and Sciences awarded her a Grammy Legend Award in 1991, then the Grammy Lifetime Achievement Award in 1994. Franklin was a Kennedy Center Honoree in 1994, recipient of the National Medal of Arts in 1999, recipient of the American Academy of Achievement's Golden Plate Award presented by Awards Council member Coretta Scott King, and was bestowed the Presidential Medal of Freedom in 2005 by then President George W. Bush. She was inducted into the Michigan Rock and Roll Legends Hall of Fame in 2005, and the Rhythm & Blues Hall of Fame in 2015. Franklin became the second woman inducted to the UK Music Hall of Fame in 2005. She was the 2008 MusiCares Person of the Year, performing at the Grammys days later. In 2019 she was awarded a Pulitzer Prize Special Citation "[f]or her indelible contribution to American music and culture for more than five decades". Franklin was the first individual woman to receive a Pulitzer Prize Special Citation.

In 2010 Franklin was ranked first on Rolling Stone magazine's list of the "100 Greatest Singers of All Time" and ninth on their list of "100 Greatest Artists of All Time". Following news of Franklin's surgery and recovery in February 2011, the Grammys ceremony paid tribute to the singer with a medley of her classics performed by Christina Aguilera, Florence Welch, Jennifer Hudson, Martina McBride, and Yolanda Adams. That same year, she was ranked 19th among the Billboard Hot 100 All-Time top artists.

When Rolling Stone listed the "Women in Rock: 50 Essential Albums" in 2002 and again 2012, it listed Franklin's 1967, I Never Loved a Man the Way I Love You, number one. Inducted to the GMA Gospel Music Hall of Fame in 2012, Franklin was described as "the voice of the civil rights movement, the voice of black America". Asteroid 249516 Aretha was named in her honor in 2014. The next year, Billboard named her the greatest female R&B artist of all time. In 2018, Franklin was inducted in to the Memphis Music Hall of Fame.

"American history wells up when Aretha sings", President Obama explained in response to her performance of "A Natural Woman" at the 2015 Kennedy Center Honors. "Nobody embodies more fully the connection between the African-American spiritual, the blues, R&B, rock and roll—the way that hardship and sorrow were transformed into something full of beauty and vitality and hope." Franklin later recalled the 2015 Kennedy Center Honors as one of the best nights of her life. On June 8, 2017, the City of Detroit honored Franklin's legacy by renaming a portion of Madison Street, between Brush and Witherell Streets, Aretha Franklin Way. The Aretha Franklin Post Office Building was named in 2021, and is located at 12711 East Jefferson Avenue in Detroit, Michigan.

Rolling Stone called Franklin "the greatest singer of her generation".

In April 2021, Aretha Franklin was featured in National Geographic magazine and in the previous month, the society began airing the third season of the television series Genius about her life and career. After working with the artist for nearly four decades, Clive Davis, said that Aretha "understood the essence of both language and melody and was able to take it to a place very few—if any—could". According to National Geographic, "she was a musical genius unmatched in her range, power, and soul".

Honorary degrees
Franklin received honorary degrees from Harvard University and New York University in 2014, as well as honorary doctorates in music from Princeton University, 2012; Yale University, 2010; Brown University, 2009; University of Pennsylvania, 2007; Berklee College of Music, 2006; New England Conservatory of Music, 1997; and University of Michigan, 1987. She was awarded an honorary Doctor of Humane Letters by Case Western Reserve University 2011 and Wayne State University in 1990 and an honorary Doctor of Law degree by Bethune–Cookman University in 1975.

Tributes
Both stations were originally named after other people. Although the fan tributes were later taken down, the subway system's operator, the Metropolitan Transportation Authority, placed permanent black-and-white stickers with the word "Respect" next to the "Franklin" name signs in each station.

During the American Music Awards on October 9, 2018, the show was closed by bringing Gladys Knight, Donnie McClurkin, Ledisi, Cece Winans, and Mary Mary together to pay tribute to Aretha Franklin. The "all-star" group performed gospel songs, including renditions from Franklin's 1972 album, Amazing Grace.

A tribute concert, "Aretha! A Grammy Celebration for the Queen of Soul", was organized by CBS and the Recording Academy on January 13, 2019, at the Shrine Auditorium in Los Angeles. The concert included performances by Smokey Robinson, Janelle Monáe, Alicia Keys, John Legend, Kelly Clarkson, Celine Dion, Alessia Cara, Patti LaBelle, Jennifer Hudson, Chloe x Halle, H.E.R., SZA, Brandi Carlile, Yolanda Adams and Shirley Caesar, and was recorded for television, airing on March 10.

At the 61st Annual Grammy Awards, the ceremony was ended with a memorial tribute to the life and career of Franklin. The tribute concluded with a rendition of her 1968 hit, "A Natural Woman (You Make Me Feel Like)", performed by Fantasia Barrino-Taylor, Andra Day and Yolanda Adams.

Portrayals in media
On January 29, 2018, Gary Graff confirmed that Jennifer Hudson would play Franklin in an upcoming biopic. Franklin's biopic Respect was released in August 2021 in various countries.

On February 10, 2019, it was announced that the subject of the third season of the American National Geographic anthology television series Genius would be Franklin, in the "first-ever, definitive scripted miniseries on the life of the universally acclaimed Queen of Soul". The season, starring Cynthia Erivo as Franklin, was aired in March 2021. However, Franklin's family denounced the series, claiming to be uninvolved with the production process, despite the production team stating that the series had been endorsed by the Franklin estate.

Discography

Studio albums

Filmography
Concerts, Specials, Appearances 
1967-1982: The Tonight Show Starring Johnny Carson - Guest
1968: Aretha Franklin and The Sweet Inspirations in Concert
1968: The Hollywood Palace - Guest
1969: 41st Academy Awards - Performer
1970: This is Tom Jones - Guest
1970: It's Cliff Richard - Guest - BBC
1970: It's Lulu - Guest - BBC
1978: Dick Clark's Live Wednesday - Guest - ABC
1978: Aretha Franklin Live in Canada - ITV
1978: Kennedy Center Honors - CBS
1981-1985: Solid Gold - Performer - CBS
1982: It's Not Easy Bein' Me - Guest - NBC
1983: American Music Awards of 1983 - Performer/Host - ABC
1983: Midem '83 - Performer - TF1
1985: Soundstage - Performer - PBS
1986:  American Music Awards of 1986  - Performer - ABC
1988: James Brown and Friends: Set Fire To The Soul - Performer - HBO
1990: Night of 100 Stars III - Performer - NBC
1991-1992: The Joan Rivers Show - Performer - HBO
1992: 23rd Annual Grammy Awards - Performer - CBS
1992: Kennedy Center Honors -Performer - CBS
1993: Evening at Pops - Performer - PBS
Documentaries
1972: Black Rodeo (documentary)
1990: Listen Up: The Lives of Quincy Jones (documentary)
2003: Tom Dowd & the Language of Music (documentary)
2012: The Zen of Bennett (documentary)
2013: Muscle Shoals (documentary)
2018: Amazing Grace (documentary)
As an actress
1972: Room 222 (as Inez Jackson)
1980: The Blues Brothers (as Mrs. Murphy)
1991: Murphy Brown (as Herself)
1997: The Brave Little Toaster to the Rescue (as voice of Homebuilt Computer)
1998: Blues Brothers 2000 (as Mrs. Murphy)

See also
 List of awards and nominations received by Aretha Franklin

Citations

General sources

External links

 
 Aretha Franklin  songwriter/composer catalog at Broadcast Music, Inc.
 Aretha Franklin 
 
 
 Aretha Franklin at NPR Music
 

 
1942 births
2018 deaths
20th-century African-American women singers
20th-century American pianists
20th-century American singers
20th-century American women singers
21st-century African-American women singers
21st-century American composers
21st-century American singers
21st-century American women singers
20th-century Baptists
21st-century Baptists
21st-century women composers
Activists for African-American civil rights
African-American actresses
African-American Christians
African-American women singers
African-American feminists
African-American pianists
African-American rock singers
African-American songwriters
American dance musicians
American women pop singers
American women rock singers
American gospel singers
American mezzo-sopranos
American pop rock singers
American rhythm and blues singers
American soul singers
American women pianists
Arista Records artists
Atlantic Records artists
Ballad musicians
Baptists from Michigan
Baptists from Tennessee
Burials at Woodlawn Cemetery (Detroit)
Checker Records artists
Columbia Records artists
Culture of Detroit
Deaths from cancer in Michigan
Deaths from pancreatic cancer
Feminist musicians
Grammy Legend Award winners
Grammy Lifetime Achievement Award winners
Kennedy Center honorees
Michigan Democrats
Musicians from Memphis, Tennessee
Northern High School (Detroit, Michigan) alumni
Presidential Medal of Freedom recipients
Pulitzer Prize winners
RCA Records artists
Rhythm and blues pianists
Singers from Detroit
Songwriters from Michigan
Songwriters from Tennessee
Tennessee Democrats
United States National Medal of Arts recipients